Beni is a village development committee in Solukhumbu District in the Sagarmatha Zone of north-eastern Nepal. At the time of the 1991 Nepal census it had a population of 1927 people living in 352 individual households.

References

External links
UN map of the municipalities of Solukhumbu District

Sherpa Guide Nepal 
www.sherpaguidenepal.com
www.pasangdendi.com.np
solukhumbu Beni 6 Khamje

Populated places in Solukhumbu District